Brought by the Sea is a 2010 Turkish drama film, directed by Nesli Çölgeçen, about an ex-cop who accidentally kills an African immigrant and retreats with a guilty conscience back to his hometown.

Production
The film was shot on location in the Aegean towns of Ortaca, Dalyan and Dalaman, Turkey.

Synopsis
Halil (Onur Saylak) is a cop who accidentally kills an African illegal immigrant; he resigns and retires with a guilty conscience back to his hometown. Jordan (Jordan Deniz Boyner) is a five-year-old boy from Ghana whose mother is killed in an accident in Dalyan as they try to cross illegally to Greece. When Halil finds Jordan, their destinies intersect.

Release

General release

Festival screenings
 29th International Istanbul Film Festival (April 3–18, 2010)
 32nd International Moscow Film Festival (June 17–26, 2010)
 17th Adana "Golden Boll" International Film Festival

Reception

Box office
The film was in the Turkish box office charts for ten weeks and has made a total gross of US$38,949.

Reviews
Emine Yıdırım, writing in Today's Zaman, says this is, "a film which aims to say a lot", and, "indeed underlines the dire situation of the thousands of refugees that try to cross the borders of Turkey and Greece", but, "while achieving some of its ambitions, specifically those of the political and worldly context, Brought by the Sea unfortunately disappoints on some very crucial emotional points."

Awards
 17th Adana "Golden Boll" International Film Festival (September 20–26, 2010) Grand Jury "Yılmaz Güney" Best Picture (won)

See also 
 2010 in film
 Turkish films of 2010
 Cinema of Turkey

References

External links
  for the film (Turkish)
 

2010 films
2010 drama films
Films set in Turkey
Turkish drama films
2010s Turkish-language films